Ladybarn is a small suburban area in Manchester, England, around Ladybarn Lane. It is now part of Manchester's urban sprawl but some of the village's original cobbled streets remain. The oldest properties are probably Rose Cottages, dating from the late 18th century.

Ladybarn Village, consisting of around 20 shops, is on Mauldeth Road: to the north is Ladybarn Lane. Ladybarn is a quieter area compared to the busy student centres on its borders. Two primary schools are within walking distance and transport links include Mauldeth Road railway station, bus route 44 to Manchester city centre and cross-town routes 22, 178 and 179.

The area is named after Lady Barn House, formerly used as the Lady Barn House School, founded in 1873 by William Henry Herford.

References

External links

Areas of Manchester